Johann Tserclaes, Count of Tilly (February 1559 – 30 April 1632) was a field marshal who commanded the Catholic League's forces in the Thirty Years' War. From 1620–31, he had an unmatched and demoralizing string of important victories against the Protestants, including White Mountain, Wimpfen, Höchst, Stadtlohn and the Conquest of the Palatinate. He destroyed a Danish army at Lutter and sacked the Protestant city of Magdeburg, which caused the death of some 20,000 of the city's inhabitants, both defenders and non-combatants, out of a total population of 25,000. 

Tilly was then crushed at Breitenfeld in 1631 by the Swedish army of King Gustavus Adolphus. A Swedish arquebus bullet wounded him severely at the Battle of Rain, and he died two weeks later in Ingolstadt. Along with Duke Albrecht von Wallenstein of Friedland and Mecklenburg, he was one of two chief commanders of the Holy Roman Empire’s forces in the first half of the war.

Early years
Johann Tserclaes was born in February 1559 in Castle Tilly, Walloon Brabant, now in Belgium, then the Spanish Netherlands. Johann Tserclaes was born into a devoutly Roman Catholic Brabantine family; and, after having received a Jesuit education in Cologne, he joined the Spanish army at age fifteen and fought under Alessandro Farnese, Duke of Parma and Piacenza in his campaign against the Dutch forces rebelling in the Eighty Years' War and participated in the successful Siege of Antwerp in 1585. After this he joined in the Holy Roman Empire's campaign against the Ottoman Turks in Hungary and Transylvania as a mercenary in 1600 and through rapid promotion became a field marshal in only five years. When the Turkish Wars ended in 1606, he remained in the service of Rudolf II in Prague until he was appointed commander of the Catholic League forces by Bavaria under Maximilian I, Duke of Bavaria in 1610.

Campaign in Bohemia
As commander of the forces of the Catholic League he fought against the Bohemian rebels following the Defenestration of Prague, by which time he had trained his soldiers in the Spanish Tercio system, which featured musketeers supported by deep ranks of pikemen. A force of 25,000 soldiers, including troops of both the Catholic League and the Emperor scored an important victory against Christian of Anhalt and Count Thurn at the decisive Battle of White Mountain west of Prague on 8 November 1620.  Half of the enemy forces were killed or captured, while the Catholic League lost only 700 men. This victory was vital in crushing resistance to the Emperor in Bohemia, as it allowed Prague to be captured several days later.

Campaign in Germany

Next he turned west and marched through Germany, but was defeated at the Battle of Mingolsheim on 27 April 1622. He then joined with the Spanish general Duke Gonzalo Fernández de Córdoba – not to be confused with the famous Spanish general of the same name from the Italian Wars in Italy at the end of the 15th century – and was victorious at the Battle of Wimpfen against George Fredrick, Margrave of Baden-Durlach on 6 May; this victory occurred after the enemies’ ammunition tumbril was hit by cannon fire and exploded.

He was successful again at the Battle of Höchst on 20 June and was made a count (Graf in German) for this victory. These three battles in two months allowed him to capture the city of Heidelberg following an eleven-week siege on 19 September. Christian the Younger of Brunswick, whom he had already defeated at Höchst, raised another army, but again lost to him at the Battle of Stadtlohn, where 13,000 out of his army of 15,000 were lost, including fifty of his high-ranking officers. Together with the complete surrender of Bohemia in 1623, this ended virtually all resistance in Germany. This caused King Christian IV of Denmark to enter the Thirty Years' War in 1625 to protect Protestantism, and also in a bid to make himself the primary leader of Northern Europe. Count Tilly besieged and captured Münden on 30 May 1626, whereupon local and refugee Protestant ministers were thrown into the river Werra, but could not lay a siege to Kassel. 

Tilly fought the Danes at the Battle of Lutter on 26–27 August 1626, in which his highly disciplined infantry charged the enemy lines four times, breaking through. This led him to win decisively, destroying  more than half the fleeing Danish army, which was uncharacteristic of the warfare of the time. Denmark was forced to sue for peace at the Treaty of Lübeck. This disrupted the balance of power in Europe resulting in Swedish involvement in 1630 under their redoubtable leader, the brilliant King and field general Gustavus Adolphus of Sweden, who had been trying to dominate the Baltic for the previous ten years in wars with Poland, then a continental power of note.

Sack of Magdeburg

While Gustavus Adolphus landed his army in Mecklenburg and was in Berlin, trying to make alliances with the leaders of Northern Germany, Tilly laid siege to the city of Magdeburg on the Elbe, which promised to support Sweden.
The siege began on 20 March 1631 and Tilly put his subordinate Gottfried Heinrich Graf zu Pappenheim in command while he campaigned elsewhere. After two months of laying siege, and after the fall of Frankfurt an der Oder to the Swedes, Pappenheim finally convinced Tilly, who had brought reinforcements, to storm the city on 20 May with 40,000 men under the personal command of Pappenheim. The assault was successful and the walls were breached, but the commanders supposedly lost control of their soldiers. A massacre of the populace ensued in which roughly 20,000 of the 25,000 inhabitants of the city perished by sword and the fire which destroyed most of the city, then one of the largest cities in Germany and about the size of Cologne or Hamburg.

Many historians consider it unlikely that he ordered the city torched. Magdeburg was a strategically vital city of the Elbe and was needed as a resupply center for the looming fight against the Swedes. Although extremely opposed to the Reformation movement, Tilly was an experienced commander and would have recognized the strategic importance of the city. Additionally, he sent a proposal of surrender to Magdeburg days before the final assault, after the capture of the Toll redoubt. However, the city's mayor rejected the offer, expecting a Swedish relief force to arrive soon. When the slaughter began, and no escape was possible, the children of the city were formed in procession and marched across the marketplace singing Luther's hymn Erhalt uns, Herr, bei deinem Wort whose opening verse  translates as "Lord keep us steadfast in thy Word, Curb Pope and Turk who by the sword, would wrest the kingdom from thy Son, and set at naught all he hath done." The children were slain without mercy, but whether by order from Tilly or not remains debated in some quarters. Tilly afterwards reportedly wrote to the Emperor,

Campaign against the Swedes and death
Following Magdeburg, Tilly engaged the army of Gustavus Adolphus at the Battle of Breitenfeld on 17 September 1631, near the city of Leipzig, which he had reached after laying waste to Saxony. In the battle he was outmaneuvered by King Gustavus Adolphus and suffered 27,000 casualties. The Swedes’ maneuvering and accurate, rapid artillery fire caused his troops to break and flee. He withdrew, and political rivalries prevented Wallenstein from coming to his aid, so he turned to defence. He defeated the Swedes at Bamberg on 9 March 1632. While attempting to prevent the Swedes from crossing into Bavaria over the Lech near Rain am Lech, he was wounded early in the Battle of Rain on 15 April by a 90-gram arquebus bullet (not, as erroneously reported, by a culverin cannon ball), which shattered his right thigh, and died of osteomyelitis (bone infection) fifteen days later in Ingolstadt at the age of 73 on 30 April 1632. His tomb is in Altötting, Upper Bavaria.

Descendants
A fraternal descendant, Antonio Octavio Tserclaes de Tilly (1646–1715), was a Spanish general and nobleman. A sister or daughter, Albertina, of this Prince Antonio Octavio, would be the first root for the Spanish ducal title, Dukes of Tserclaes, bestowed in July 1856 by Queen Isabella II of Spain to members of the Pérez de Guzmán, family, living in Jerez and Seville, Spain.

Fictional appearances
 Tilly is mentioned in Bertolt Brecht's Mother Courage and Her Children: in the scene in which his funeral is held, Mother Courage famously says "I don't care if this funeral is a historical event, to me the mutilation of my daughter's face is a historical event."
 Tilly and the sack of Magdeburg are mentioned in the novel The Hangman's Daughter.
 Tilly is depicted in First Breitenfeld and in the Battle of Rain in the novel 1632.

Notes

References

External links

 German-Page >Battle of Wiesloch

1559 births
1632 deaths
People from Villers-la-Ville
People from the Duchy of Brabant
South Netherlandish people of the Thirty Years' War
Johann
Flemish nobility
Spanish generals
Military personnel of the Thirty Years' War
Field marshals of the Holy Roman Empire
Dutch military personnel killed in action
Infectious disease deaths in Germany